Carmen Quiroga de Urmeneta (September 12, 1812 – December 4, 1897) was a Chilean philanthropist.

She was born September 18, 1812 in San Juan de la Puntilla (San Juan's Point), on the banks of the Rio Grande in Ovalle in the Coquimbo Region. Her parents were Juan Bautista de Quiroga and Antonia Darrigrand. She married the philanthropist Jose Tomas de Urmeneta and continued his social charities. As president of various religious and aid societies, and she contributed to the founding of churches and homes for the poor. She died on December 4, 1897.

Notes

References

1812 births
1897 deaths
Chilean philanthropists
19th-century philanthropists